Arsenicicoccus piscis is a Gram-positive bacteria from the genus Arsenicicoccus which has been isolated of the gut of the fish Sillago japonica from Awa in Japan.

References 

Micrococcales
Bacteria described in 2010